Taoyuan station, is an interchange station for Line 1 and Line 12 of Shenzhen Metro in Shenzhen, Guangdong Province, China. Line 1 platforms opened on 15 June 2011 and Line 12 platforms opened on 28 November 2022.

Station layout

Exits

References

External links
 Shenzhen Metro Taoyuan Station (Chinese)
 Shenzhen Metro Taoyuan Station (English)

Railway stations in Guangdong
Shenzhen Metro stations
Nanshan District, Shenzhen
Railway stations in China opened in 2011